The Lees Knowles Lectureship was established at Trinity College, Cambridge in 1912 and lectures are given by distinguished experts in military and naval history.  Selection for this lectureship is considered one of the highest honours available to specialists in military history and affairs. The lectureship was established by a bequest by Trinity alumnus and military historian Sir Lees Knowles.

References

Further reading
Geoffrey Parker (1998). The Military Revolution: Military Innovation and the Rise of the West 1500–1800, Cambridge University Press,  p. xiii. "A short biography on Sir Lees-Knowles"

Trinity College, Cambridge

Lecture series at the University of Cambridge
1912 establishments in England
Awards established in 1912
Annual events in the United Kingdom